The Buchberg is a 674-metre-high mountain in the Bavarian Fichtel Mountains.

The mountain, which is formed from porphyritic granite, lies south of the village of Reicholdsgrün, in the borough of Kirchenlamitz in the district of Wunsiedel im Fichtelgebirge.

The Buchberg is cloaked by a forest, 23 hectares in area, which is one of the few near-natural stands of deciduous forest in the Fichtel Mountains (woodrush beech forest). As a result, the area has been a protected natural monument since 1938 and is also a designated Natura 2000 region.

On the north side of the granite rock face is a memorial tablet to Arthur Münch, who held the post of gamekeeper and forest manager for decades.

Sources 
 Dietmar Herrmann: Lexikon Fichtelgebirge, Hof 2000, p. 95
 Rudolf Thiem: Gedenktafel Dr. Münch. In: Der Siebenstern 2006, p. 138
 Willi Fischer: Ein Juwel der Natur. In the Frankenpost Hof dated 11 February 2011

Mountains of the Fichtelgebirge
Mountains of Bavaria
Mountains under 1000 metres